Hans Eijkenbroek (born 5 January 1940 in Schiedam) is a retired association football player  and manager from the Netherlands.

Playing career

Club
Born in Schiedam, he started his career at local side Hermes DVS and was scouted by Sparta Rotterdam legend Denis Neville in 1962. With Sparta he played in two KNVB Cup Finals, winning one. He was Sparta captain when goalkeeper Eddy Treijtel shot down a gull from a goal-kick during a derby match against Feyenoord in 1970. Eijkenbroek subsequently threw the bird off the pitch only for a Sparta employee to have it stuffed and put in either Sparta's or Feyenoord's club museum.

Nicknamed De Eijk, he also played for Willem II.

International
Eijkenbroek made his debut for the Netherlands in an April 1967 friendly match against Belgium and earned a total of 18 caps, scoring no goals. His final international was a January 1970 friendly against England.

Managerial career
He played under manager Georg Keßler at Sparta and the national team, and later became his assistant at AZ '67, before taking the reins himself. He also managed Haarlem and Roda JC, where we was dismissed in November 1984. He has worked at FC Dordrecht since 1995.

References

1940 births
Living people
Footballers from Schiedam
Association football midfielders
Dutch footballers
Netherlands international footballers
Hermes DVS players
Sparta Rotterdam players
Willem II (football club) players
Eredivisie players
Dutch football managers
AZ Alkmaar managers
Roda JC Kerkrade managers
HFC Haarlem managers